Guingamp is a commune in the Côtes-d'Armor department in Brittany in northwestern France. With a population of 6,895 as of 2017, Guingamp is one of the smallest towns in Europe to have a top-tier professional football team: En Avant Guingamp, which played in Ligue 1 from 2013 until 2019. Guingamp station is served by high speed trains to Brest, Rennes and Paris, and regional trains to Brest, Lannion, Carhaix, Paimpol and Rennes.

History
The town has the remains of three successive castles, the last of which was razed to the ground by the order of Cardinal Richelieu. They were reduced to three towers.

Vincent de Bourbon, great-grandson of Louis XIV, was Count of Guingamp from 1750 until his death in 1752.

Population

Sports
The city is well-known for its professional football team, En Avant de Guingamp, which won the Coupe de France against Rennes in the 2008–09 season while it was still part of Ligue 2. The team returned to Ligue 1 for the 2013–14 season for the first time in 9 years. Guingamp again won the French Cup against Rennes in 2013–14 and qualified for the 2014–15 UEFA Europa League.

With 18,120 seats, the club's stadium has a higher capacity than Guingamp's total population of 6,895.

Culture
The Saint Loup festival, a national competition of Breton dances and international festival, takes place every in around mid August. It culminates in a traditional dance called la Dérobée de Guingamp. The festival features Celtic musicians from Asturias, Ireland, Galicia, Scotland, Wales, and elsewhere. Breton dance features in other cultural manifestations and the local cultural office organizes a contemporary creative dance week.

The municipality launched a plan for the Breton language through Ya d'ar brezhoneg on 8 July 2008. In 2008, 15.89% of primary school children attended bilingual schools.

The annual 'pardon' brings pilgrims to pay homage to the 'Black Virgin' in the Basilica of Notre Dame de Bon Secours.

Personalities
Joseph Guy Ropartz, composer
Théophile Marie Brébant, Colonel in the French Army

Twin towns – sister cities
Guingamp is twinned with:
 Shannon, Ireland, since 1991
 Aue, Germany, since 2011
 Urbino, Italy

See also
Communes of the Côtes-d'Armor department
Élie Le Goff, sculptor of Guingamp statue of Joan of Arc

References

External links

Guingamp Tourist Office (in French)
 

Communes of Côtes-d'Armor
Subprefectures in France
Osismii